Maulana Lutf ur Rehman is a Pakistani politician hailing from Dera Ismail Khan belong to Jamiat Ulema-e Islam (F). He served as a member of the Provincial Assembly of Khyber Pakhtunkhwa from May 2013 to May 2018 and from August 2018 to January 2023. He served as the Leader of the Opposition of the 10th Khyber Pakhtunkhwa Assembly.

Background and political career 
Maulana Lutfur Rehman was born into an influential political family of Dera Ismail Khan. He is the son of Mufti Mahmud the president of Jamiat Ulema-e-Islam after the 1970 general elections and also served as the Chief Minister of Khyber Pakhtunkhwa, formerly known as the North West Frontier Province (NWFP). He is the younger brother of Maulana Fazl-ur-Rehman the chief of Jamiat Ulema-e Islam (F) and Atta-ur-Rehman.

References

Living people
Pashtun people
Jamiat Ulema-e-Islam (F) politicians
Khyber Pakhtunkhwa MPAs 2013–2018
People from Dera Ismail Khan District
Khyber Pakhtunkhwa MPAs 2018–2023
Leaders of the Opposition in the Provincial Assembly of Khyber Pakhtunkhwa
Muttahida Majlis-e-Amal MPAs (Khyber Pakhtunkhwa)
Year of birth missing (living people)